James of Padua (died 1321) was a 14th-century Franciscan missionary. He was beheaded alongside Thomas of Tolentino, Peter of Siena and Demetrius of Tiflis at Thane by Muslims en route to evangelizing Sri Lanka and China. They were beatified by Pope Leo XIII in 1894 as the FourMartyrsofThane, with their memorial on 9 April.

References

Sources
http://catholicsaints.info/blessed-james-of-padua/

Franciscan beatified people
Italian beatified people
14th-century Italian clergy
Clergy from Padua
1321 deaths